Nicole Ahsinger (born May 12, 1998) is an American individual and synchronised trampoline gymnast. She won first place at the USA Gymnastics Championships in 2017, 2019, and 2021.

Career
Ahsinger competed in many international competitions, including four Trampoline World Championships. She competed at the 2016 Summer Olympics, where she finished in 15th place in the qualifying round, and at the 2020 Summer Olympics, where she finished in 6th place in the final round.

Personal
She lives in Lafayette, Louisiana, where she trains at Trampoline and Tumbling Express. She is originally from San Diego, California. She attended Scripps Ranch High School.

References

1998 births
Living people
American female trampolinists
Gymnasts at the 2014 Summer Youth Olympics
Gymnasts at the 2016 Summer Olympics
Olympic gymnasts of the United States
Pan American Games medalists in gymnastics
Pan American Games silver medalists for the United States
Gymnasts at the 2019 Pan American Games
Medalists at the 2019 Pan American Games
Gymnasts at the 2020 Summer Olympics
21st-century American women